James Saxon may refer to:

 James Saxon (actor) (1954–2003), British actor
 James Saxon (painter) (1772–1819 or later), British portrait painter
 James Saxon (American football) (born 1966), American National Football League coach and former running back
 James J. Saxon (1914–1980), 21st Comptroller of the Currency for the United States Department of the Treasury